Sheykh Hasan (also Romanized as Sheykh Ḩasan, Shaikh Hasan, and Sheikh Hasan; also known as Sheykh Khasan) is a village in Lahijan Rural District, Khosrowshahr District, Tabriz County, East Azerbaijan Province, Iran. At the 2006 census, its population was 2,240, in 552 families.

References 

Populated places in Tabriz County